Stade de la Réunification is a multi-use stadium in Douala, Cameroon.  It is currently used mostly for football matches and serves as a home ground of Union Douala. The stadium holds 39,000 people and was built in 1972.

References

External links
Stade de la réunification à Douala, au Cameroun - egis.fr

Sports venues completed in 1972
Football venues in Cameroon
Sport in Douala
Buildings and structures in Douala
1972 establishments in Cameroon